Blues News  is a bi-monthly Finnish blues and roots music magazine.

History and profile
Blues News was founded in 1968, making it one of the oldest blues magazines still in print in the world. The magazine is published by Finnish Blues Society (FBS ry). The FBS is a non-profitable association, sponsored by the Ministry of Culture and the City of Helsinki. The name of the society was changed to Suomen afroamerikkalaisen musiikin yhdistys (SAMY ry) in 1980. In 2006, the name reverted to the original FBS. The Society has its own record label, Blue North Records.

References

External links
Bluesnews.fi

1968 establishments in Finland
Bi-monthly magazines published in Finland
Blues music magazines
Finnish-language magazines
Magazines established in 1968
Magazines published in Helsinki